Szczechy Małe  is a village in the administrative district of Gmina Pisz, within Pisz County, Warmian-Masurian Voivodeship, in northern Poland.

Notable residents
 Wilhelm Joswig (1912–1989), Luftwaffe officer

References

Villages in Pisz County